Hussein bin Ali al-Hashimi (1 May 18544 June 1931) was an Arab leader from the Banu Hashim clan who was the Sharif and Emir of Mecca from 1908 and, after proclaiming the Great Arab Revolt against the Ottoman Empire, King of the Hejaz from 1916 to 1924 and Caliph from 1924 to 1925.

After the abolition of the Ottoman Caliphate he was briefly proclaimed Caliph until the invasion of the Hejaz by the Saudis the following year. He was a 37th-generation direct descendant of Muhammad, as he belonged to the Hashemite family.

A member of the Dhawu Awn clan of the Qatadid emirs of Mecca, he was perceived to have rebellious inclinations and in 1893 was summoned to Istanbul, where he was kept on the Council of State. In 1908, in the aftermath of the Young Turk Revolution, he was appointed Emir of Mecca by the Ottoman sultan Abdul Hamid II.

In 1916, with the promise of British support for Arab independence, he proclaimed the Arab Revolt against the Ottoman Empire, accusing the Committee of Union and Progress of violating tenets of Islam and limiting the power of the sultan-caliph. Shortly after the outbreak of the revolt, Hussein declared himself "King of the Arab Countries". However, his pan-Arab aspirations were not accepted by the Allies, who recognized him only as King of the Hejaz.

In the aftermath of World War I, Hussein refused to ratify the Treaty of Versailles, in protest at the Balfour Declaration and the establishment of British and French mandates in Syria, Iraq, and Palestine. He later refused to sign the Anglo-Hashemite Treaty and thus deprived himself of British support when his kingdom was attacked by Ibn Saud.

In March 1924, when the Ottoman Caliphate was abolished, Hussein proclaimed himself "Caliph of all Muslims". In October 1924, facing defeat by Ibn Saud, he abdicated and was succeeded as king by his eldest son Ali. His sons Faisal and Abdullah were made rulers of Iraq and Transjordan respectively in 1921. After the Kingdom of Hejaz was invaded by the Al Saud-Wahhabi armies of the Ikhwan, on 23 December 1925 King Hussein bin Ali surrendered to the Saudis, bringing both the Kingdom of Hejaz and the Sharifate of Mecca to an end.

Early life
Hussein bin Ali bin Muhammad bin Abd al-Mu'in bin Awn was born in Istanbul in 1853 or 1854 as the eldest son of Sharif Ali bin Muhammad, who was the second son of Muhammad ibn Abd al-Mu'in, the former Emir of Mecca. As a sharif, he was a descendant of Muhammad through his grandson Hasan ibn Ali and a member of the ancient Hashemite house. His mother Bezm-i Cihan, the wife of Ali, was a Circassian.

He belonged to the Dhawu Awn clan of the Abadilah, a branch of the Banu Qatadah tribe. The Banu Qatadah had ruled the Emirate of Mecca since the assumption of their ancestor Qatadah ibn Idris in 1201, and were the last of four dynasties of sharifs that altogether had ruled Mecca since the 10th century.

In 1827 Sharif Muhammad bin Abd al-Mu'in was appointed to the emirate, becoming the first emir from the Dhawu Awn and bringing an end to the centuries-long dominance of the Dhawu Zayd. He reigned until 1851, when he was replaced by Sharif Abd al-Muttalib ibn Ghalib of the Dhawu Zayd. After being deposed he was sent along with his family and sons to reside in the Ottoman capital of Istanbul. It was there that Hussein was born to Muhammad's son Ali in 1270 AH (1853–1854). Muhammad was reappointed to the emirate in 1856, and Hussein, then aged two or three, accompanied his father and grandfather back to Mecca. However, Muhammad died in 1858 and was succeeded by his eldest son Sharif Abd Allah Pasha. A few years later, in 1278 AH (1861–1862), Ali was recalled to Istanbul while Hussein remained in the Hejaz under the care of his uncle Abd Allah.

Hussein was raised at home unlike other young sharifs, who were customarily sent outside of the city to grow up among the nomadic Bedouin. Reportedly a studious youth, he mastered the principles of the Arabic language and was also educated in Islamic law and doctrine. Among his teachers was Shaykh Muhammad Mahmud at-Turkizi ash-Shinqiti, with whom he studied the seven Mu'allaqat. With Shaykh Ahmad Zayni Dahlan he studied the Qur'an, completing its memorization before he was 20 years old.

During Abd Allah's reign, Hussein became familiar with the politics and intrigue surrounding the sharifian court. He also participated in numerous expeditions to Nejd and the eastern regions of the Hejaz to meet with the Arab tribes, over whom the emir exerted a loose form of control. He learned the ways of the Bedouin, including the skills needed to withstand the harsh desert environment. In his travels, he gained a deep knowledge of the desert flora and fauna, and developed a liking for humayni verse, a type of vernacular poetry (malhun) of the Bedouin. He also practiced horse-riding and hunting.

In 1287 AH (1871–1872) Hussein traveled to Istanbul to visit his father, who had fallen ill. He returned to Mecca after his father's death later that year.

In 1875, he married Abd Allah's daughter Abdiyah. In 1877 Abd Allah died, and Hussein and his cousin Ali ibn Abd Allah were conferred the rank of pasha.

Abd Allah was succeeded by his brother, Sharif Husayn Pasha. After Husayn was assassinated in 1880, the Sultan reinstated Abd al-Muttalib of the Dhawu Zayd as Emir. Displeased at the removal of the Dhawu Awn line from the emirate, Hussein traveled to Istanbul with two cousins, Ali and Muhammad, and their uncle Abd al-Ilah. However they were ordered to return to Mecca by the Sultan, whose intelligence services suspected that the sharifs were conspiring with European powers, particularly the British, to return the Sharifate to their clan.

The emirate returned to the Dhawu Awn in 1882 with the deposition of Abd al-Muttalib and the appointment of Sharif Awn ar-Rafiq Pasha, the next eldest of the remaining sons of Sharif Muhammad.

As Emir
Following the removal of his predecessor in October and the sudden death of his successor shortly thereafter, Hussein was appointed grand sharif by official decree of the sultan Abdülhamid on 24 November 1908.

Relationship with the Turks
Though there is no evidence to suggest that Sharif Hussein bin Ali was inclined to Arab nationalism before 1916, the rise of Turkish nationalism under the Ottoman Empire, culminating in the 1908 Young Turk Revolution, nevertheless displeased the Hashemites and resulted in a rift between them and the Ottoman revolutionaries. During World War I, Hussein initially remained allied with the Ottomans but began secret negotiations with the British on the advice of his son, Abdullah, who had served in the Ottoman parliament up to 1914 and was convinced that it was necessary to separate from the increasingly nationalistic Ottoman administration.

Relationship with the British

Following deliberations at Ta'if between Hussein and his sons in June 1915, during which Faisal counselled caution, Ali argued against rebellion and Abdullah advocated action and encouraged his father to enter into correspondence with Sir Henry McMahon; over the period 14 July 1915 to 10 March 1916, a total of ten letters, five from each side, were exchanged between Sir Henry McMahon and Sherif Hussein. McMahon was in contact with British Foreign Secretary Edward Grey throughout, and Grey was to authorise and be ultimately responsible for the correspondence.

The British Secretary of State for War, Field Marshal Lord Kitchener, appealed to him for assistance in the conflict on the side of the Triple Entente. Starting in 1915, as indicated by an exchange of letters with Lieutenant Colonel Sir Henry McMahon, the British High Commissioner in the Sultanate of Egypt, Hussein seized the opportunity and demanded recognition of an Arab nation that included the Hejaz and other adjacent territories as well as approval for the proclamation of an Arab Caliphate of Islam. High Commissioner McMahon accepted and assured him that his assistance would be rewarded by an Arab empire encompassing the entire span between Egypt and Persia, with the exception of British possessions and interests in Kuwait, Aden, and the Syrian coast

King of Hejaz

The US State Department quotes an aide-mémoire dated 24 October 1917 given by the Arab Bureau to the American Diplomatic Agency in Cairo confirming that "...Britain, France and Russia agreed to recognize the Sherif as lawful independent ruler of the Hejaz and to use the title of "King of the Hejaz" when addressing him, and a note to this effect was handed to him on December 10, 1916".

When Hussein declared himself King of the Hejaz, he also declared himself King of the Arab lands (malik bilad-al-Arab). This only aggravated his conflict with Abdulaziz ibn Saud, which was already present because of their differences in religious beliefs and with whom he had fought before the First World War, siding with fellow anti-Saudis, the Ottomans in 1910.

Arab Revolt

On the 2nd of Muharram 1335 (30 October 1916), Emir Abdullah called a meeting of majlis where he read a letter in which "Husayn ibn Ali was recognized as sovereign of the Arab nation. Then all those present arose and proclaimed him Malik al-Arab, King of the Arabs."

Armenian Genocide 
In April 1918, as part of his conquest of the Syrian territories in which the Armenian genocide took place, he issued a decree to protect Armenians from persecution and allow them to settle in peace, in which he ordered :

"What is requested of you is to protect and to take good care of everyone from the Jacobite Armenian community living in your territories and frontiers and among your tribes; to help them in all of their affairs and defend them as you would defend yourselves, your properties and children, and provide everything they might need whether they are settled or moving from place to place, because they are the Protected People of the Muslims (Ahl Dimmat al-Muslimin) — about whom the Prophet Muhammad (may God grant him His blessings and peace) said: "Whosoever takes from them even a rope, I will be his adversary on the day of Judgment." This is among the most important things we require of you to do and expect you to accomplish, in view of your noble character and determination."

The Armenian National Institute considers it to be the oldest declaration by a head of state to recognize the Armenian genocide.

Following World War I
In the aftermath of the war, the Arabs found themselves freed from centuries of Ottoman rule. Hussein's son Faisal was made King of Syria, but this kingdom proved short-lived, as the Middle East came under mandate rule of France and the United Kingdom. The British Government subsequently made Faisal and his brother Abdullah kings of Iraq and Transjordan, respectively.

Deterioration in British relationship
In January and February 1918, Hussein received the Hogarth Message and Bassett Letter in response to his requests for an explanation of the Balfour Declaration and Sykes-Picot Agreement respectively.

Having received a British subsidy totalling £6.5m between 1916 and April 1919, in May 1919, the subsidy was reduced to £100K monthly (from £200K), dropped to £75K from October, £50K in November, £25K in December until February 1920 after which no more payments were made.

In 1919, King Hussein refused to ratify the Treaty of Versailles. In August 1920, five days after the signing of the Treaty of Sèvres, Curzon asked Cairo to procure Hussein's signature to both treaties and agreed to make a payment of £30,000 conditional on signature. Hussein declined and in 1921, stated that he could not be expected to "affix his name to a document assigning Palestine to the Zionists and Syria to foreigners."

However, even after an assurance by McMahon, Hussein did not receive the lands promised by their British allies. McMahon claimed that the proposed lands to be taken in by the new Arab State were not purely Arab. In actuality, McMahon refused to hand over the new lands as the areas in question had already been claimed by the new British ally, France.

Exile and abdication

Two days after the Caliphate was abolished by the Turkish Grand National Assembly on 3 March 1924, Hussein declared himself Caliph at his son Abdullah's winter camp in Shunah, Transjordan. The claim to the title had a mixed reception, and Hussein was soon ousted and driven out of Arabia by the Saudis, a rival clan that had no interest in the Caliphate. Abd-ul-aziz ibn Sa'ud defeated Hussein in 1924, but he continued to use the title of Caliph when living in Transjordan. Although the British had supported Hussein from the start of the Arab Revolt and the Hussein-McMahon Correspondence, they elected not to help him to repel the Saudi attack, which eventually took Mecca, Medina, and Jeddah.  After his abdication, another of his sons, Ali, briefly assumed the throne of the Hejaz, but then he too had to flee from the encroachment of the Saudi forces. Another of Hussein's sons, Faisal, was briefly King of Syria and later King of Iraq, while Abdullah was Emir.

King Hussein was then forced to flee to Amman, Transjordan, where his son Abdullah was Emir. During this period, King Hussein is described as having taken over control that his son wielded, and therefore was sent to live in Aqaba (which was recently transferred from Hijazi to Transjordanian sovereignty by the British). Britain – responding to Ibn Saud's plea that the Sharif be expelled from Aqaba – exiled him from Aqaba to British-controlled Cyprus, where he lived in Nicosia from 1925, with his son Zaid until he was paralyzed by a stroke at age 79 in 1930, and subsequently was allowed to live in Amman, Transjordan.

King Hussein died in Amman in 1931 and was buried in Jerusalem: inside the Arghūniyya, a building on the Haram esh-Sharif or "Temple Mount", in a walled enclosure decorated with white marble and carpets.

On the window above his tomb is written the following inscription: "هذا قبر أمير المؤمنين الحسين بن علي" which means "Here is the tomb of the Commander of the Faithful, Hussein bin Ali".

Marriage and children

Hussein, who had four wives, fathered five sons and three daughters with three of his wives:
 Sharifa Abidiya bint Abdullah (died Istanbul, Turkey, 1888, buried there), eldest daughter of his paternal uncle, Amir Abdullah Kamil Pasha, Grand Sharif of Mecca;
 Madiha, a Circassian;
 Sharifa Khadija bint Abdullah  (1866 - Amman, Transjordan, 4 July 1921), second daughter of Amir Abdullah Kamil Pasha, Grand Sharif of Mecca;
 Adila Khanum (Istanbul, Turkey, 1879 - Larnaca, Cyprus, 12 July 1929, buried there at the Hala Sultan, Umm Haram, Tekke), daughter of Salah Bey and granddaughter of Mustafa Rashid Pasha, sometime Grand Vizier of the Ottoman Empire;

With his first wife Abidiya bint Abdullah, he had:
 Prince Ali, last King of Hejaz married to Nafisa bint Abdullah. Parents of Aliya bint Ali. Grandparents of Sharif Ali bin al-Hussein.
 Hasan bin Hussein,  died young.
 Prince Abdullah, Emir (later King) of Transjordan, married to Musbah bint Nasser, Suzdil Hanum, and Nahda bint Uman.
 Princess Fatima, married a European Muslim businessman from France.
 Prince Faisal, later King of Iraq and Syria, married to Huzaima bint Nasser. Parents of Ghazi, King of Iraq born 1912 died 4 April 1939, married his first cousin, Princess Aliya bint Ali, daughter of HM King Ali of Hejaz.

With his second wife Madiha, he had:
 Princess Saleha, married Abdullah bin Muhammed.

With his third wife Adila, he had:
 Princess Sara, married Muhammad Atta Amin in July 1933, divorced September 1933.
 Prince Zeid, who succeeded in pretense King Faisal II of Iraq upon his assassination in 1958, but never actually ruled as Iraq became a republic. Married to Fahrelnissa Kabaağaç.

Ancestry

See also
 Battle of Mecca 1916
 Sharifian Caliphate
 Siege of Medina
 Suleiman Mousa

Bibliography

Notes 

References
  - Total pages: 473
 Teitelbaum, Joshua (2001). The Rise and Fall of the Hashemite Kingdom of the Hijaz. C. Hurst & Co. Publishers.

Further reading

External links
 

1850s births
1931 deaths
19th-century Arabs
20th-century Arabs
20th-century caliphs
Arab independence activists
Arab Revolt
Arabs from the Ottoman Empire
Dhawu Awn
Flag designers
Hasanids
Honorary Knights Grand Cross of the Order of the Bath
House of Hashim
Kings of Hejaz
Ottoman Arab nationalists
Ottoman Arabia
Ottoman Sunni Muslims
Pan-Arabism
People from Istanbul
People from Mecca
Politics of the Ottoman Empire
Self-proclaimed monarchy
Sharifs of Mecca
People of the Arab Revolt